Khed is a census town in Satara district in the Indian state of Maharashtra.

Demographics
 India census, Khed had a population of 6897. Males constitute 52% of the population and females 48%. Khed has an average literacy rate of 66%, higher than the national average of 59.5%: male literacy is 71%, and female literacy is 60%. In Khed, 14% of the population is under 6 years of age.

References

Cities and towns in Satara district